Buleh Kola-ye Marzunabad (also Romanized as Būleh Kolā-ye Marzūnābād; also known as Būleh Kolāy and Būleh Kolā-ye Mūzīraj) is a village in Feyziyeh Rural District, in the Central District of Babol County, Mazandaran Province, Iran. At the 2006 census, its population was 819, in 223 families.

References 

Populated places in Babol County